Hassler (also Haßler, Häßler, Hässler, Hasler, ...) is a toponymic surname derived from a number of places called Hasel or Hassel in German-speaking parts of Europe.

Notable people with this name include:

Musicians
A musical dynasty in Nuremberg
Isaak Hassler (c.1530 – 1591), organist and father of three brothers:
Kasper Hassler (1562–1618), minor composer and publisher
Hans Leo Hassler (1564–1612), an important German composer and organist
Jakob Hassler (1569–1622), composer most noted for his keyboard works
Johann Wilhelm Hässler (1747–1822), German organist and composer

Athletes
Nicole Hassler (1941–1996), French figure skater
Des Hasler (b. 1961), Australian rugby league footballer and coach
Thomas Häßler (b. 1966), former German football player and 1990 World Cup winner
Dominic Hassler (b. 1981), Austrian football player

Other professions 
Johann Hasler (b. 1548, died after 1602), Swiss theologian and physician
Ferdinand Rudolph Hassler (1770–1845), first US Coast Survey superintendent
Friday Hassler (1935–1972), American NASCAR driver
Hassler Whitney (1907–1989),  American mathematician
Herbert "Blondie" Hasler (1914–1987), British Marines officer and later a noted single-handed sailor
Rolf Hassler (1914–1984), German neurobiologist
Eveline Hasler (b. 1933), Swiss writer
Jon Hassler (1933–2008) American novelist for whom is named the Jon Hassler Theater in Plainview, Minnesota
Marie Hasler (b. 1948), New Zealand politician
Harry Hasler, fictional alter ego of Viktor Giacobbo, one of his most popular satirical figures
Otmar Hasler (b. 1953), Prime Minister of Liechtenstein
Uwe Hassler(de) (b. 1963), German professor of statistics and econometrics

Surnames of Liechtenstein origin
German-language surnames